The 2007 World Group II Play-offs were four ties which involved the losing nations of the World Group II and four nations from the three Zonal Group I competitions. Nations that won their play-off ties entered the 2008 World Group II, while losing nations joined their respective zonal groups.

Australia vs. Ukraine

Argentina vs. Canada

Croatia vs. Chinese Taipei

Slovakia vs. Serbia

References 

World Group II Play-offs